The 2005 NCAA men's volleyball tournament was the 36th annual tournament to determine the national champion of NCAA men's collegiate indoor volleyball. The single elimination tournament was played at Pauley Pavilion in Los Angeles, California during May 2005.

Pepperdine defeated UCLA in the final match, 3–2 (30–23, 23–30, 24–30, 30–25, 15–10), to win their fourth national title. The Waves (25–2) were coached by Marv Dunphy.

Pepperdine's Sean Rooney was named the tournament's Most Outstanding Player. Rooney, along with six other players, comprised the All Tournament Team.

Qualification
Until the creation of the NCAA Men's Division III Volleyball Championship in 2012, there was only a single national championship for men's volleyball. As such, all NCAA men's volleyball programs, whether from Division I, Division II, or Division III, were eligible. A total of 4 teams were invited to contest this championship.

Tournament bracket 
Site: Pauley Pavilion, Los Angeles, California

All tournament team 
Sean Rooney, Pepperdine (Most outstanding player)
John Parfitt, Pepperdine
Jonathan Winder, Pepperdine
Paul Johnson, UCLA
Jonathan Acosta, UCLA
Alex Gutor, Penn State
Mark Greaves, Ohio State

See also 
 NCAA Men's National Collegiate Volleyball Championship
 NCAA Women's Volleyball Championships (Division I, Division II, Division III)

References

2005
NCAA Men's Volleyball Championship
NCAA Men's Volleyball Championship
2005 in sports in California
Volleyball in California